The 42nd Guillermo Mendoza Memorial Scholarship Foundation Box Office Entertainment Awards (GMMSF-BOEA) is a part of the annual awards in the Philippines held on May 10, 2011. The award-giving body honors Filipino actors, actresses and other performers' commercial success, regardless of artistic merit, in the Philippine entertainment industry.

Winners selection
On April 8, the Memorial Scholarship Foundation board of jurors met in the Danes Publishing House, Mindanao Avenue in Quezon City and deliberated for this year's winners.

The winners were chosen from the Top 10 Philippine films of 2010, top-rating shows in Philippine television, top recording awards received by singers, and top gross receipts of concerts and performances.

Awards ceremony
On May 10, 2011 at RCBC Plaza, Ayala Avenue in Makati, Philippines, the 42nd Box Office Entertainment Awards night was held, with the night's hosts John Estrada and Precious Lara Quigaman.

Awards

Major awards
Box Office Kings - Vic Sotto & Bong Revilla (Si Agimat at Si Enteng Kabisote)
Box Office Queen - Ai Ai delas Alas (Ang Tanging Ina Mo (Last na 'To!))
Male Concert Performer of the Year - Ogie Alcasid
Female Concert Performer of the Year - Charice
Male Recording Artist of the Year - Christian Bautista
Female Recording Artist of the Year - Sarah Geronimo

Film category
Film Actor of the Year - John Lloyd Cruz (Miss You like Crazy)
Film Actress of the Year - Bea Alonzo (Miss You like Crazy)
Prince of Philippine Movies & TV - Coco Martin (Sa 'yo Lamang)
Princess of Philippine Movies & TV - Toni Gonzaga (My Amnesia Girl)
Most Promising Male Star of the Year - Matteo Guidicelli
Most Promising Female Star of the Year - Andi Eigenmann
Most Popular Film Producer - Star Cinema
Most Popular Film Director - Tony Y. Reyes (Si Agimat at Si Enteng Kabisote) & Wenn Deramas (Ang Tanging Ina Mo (Last na 'To!))
Most Popular Screenwriter - Chris Martinez (Here Comes The Bride)

Music category
Promising Singer/Performer - Jovit Baldivino
Most Popular Recording/Performing Group - Parokya ni Edgar
Most Promising Recording/Performing Group - XLR8
Most Popular Novelty Singers - Chris Tsuper & Nicole Hyala

Television category
Most Popular Love Team of Movies & TV - Gerald Anderson & Kim Chiu (Kung Tayo'y Magkakalayo - ABS-CBN)
Most Promising Love Team - Elmo Magalona & Julie Anne San Jose (GMA-7)
Most Popular Male/Female Child Performer - Jillian Ward (GMA-7)
Most Popular TV Drama Program - Kung Tayo'y Magkakalayo (ABS-CBN)
Most Popular TV Talent Search Program - Talentadong Pinoy (TV5)
Most Popular TV News Program - 24 Oras (GMA-7)
Most Popular TV Directors - Erick Salud & Trina Dayrit (Kung Tayo'y Magkakalayo - ABS-CBN) and Rich Ilustre (Talentadong Pinoy - (TV5)

Special Awards
Bert Marcelo Memorial Award - Vice Ganda
Comedy Actor of the Year - John Lapus
Comedy Actress of the Year - Angelica Panganiban

Multiple awards

Companies with multiple awards 
The following companies received two or more awards in the television category:

References

Box Office Entertainment Awards
2011 film awards
2011 television awards
2011 music awards